'Jatusana is a village and block of Rewari district in Haryana. Previously, it was known as Jatu-Thana, one of the biggest and most powerful thanas (Police Station) in Punjab (because Haryana was itself in Punjab at that time) during the 18th and the first half of the 19th century. Ruby Rajkumar Yadav resident of Qutubpuri Bujurg is elected as Block Pramukh (Chairman) in the month of Mar 2016. Shri Satyaprakash is the current Sarpanch of this village who won the election on 24 January 2016. He is an SC candidate and win the election among 16 candidates whereas this time it was a general seat. This village is having 2920 votes 
Sh. Laxman Singh Yadav Yadav is the current MLA of Govt of Haryana.  It is located 25 km to the north of District headquarters Rewari.

This village is also having a Gaushala Named Shiv Mohan Gaushala with 1000+ cows living at here.

Village Panchayats of Jatusana Block
 Asiaki Gorawas
 Aulant
 Babdoli
 Balawas Jamapur
 Baldhan Kalan
 Baldhan Khurd
 Berli Kalan
 Berli Khurd
 Biharipur, Rewari 
 Bohatwas Bhondu
 Boria Kamalpur
 Chandanwas
 (A) Chowki No. 1, (B) Maliaki - Name of Gram Panchyat - Chowki No. 1
 Chowki No. 2 - Name of Gram Panchyat - Chowki No. 2
 Dahina
 Dakhora
 Daroli, Rewari - Similar name exists also in Karnataka, India
 Dehlawas
 Didoli
 Kahari, Rewari - Similar name exists Kähäri also in a district of the city of Turku, in Finland country.
 Dohkia
 Fatehpuri Tappa Dahina
 Gadhla
 Gopal Pur Gazi
 Gothra Tappa Dahina
 Gulabpura, Rewari
 Gurawra
 Haluhera Sarpanch - Sangeeta Devi, Panch - Pawan Yadav, Geeta Devi, Hitu, Suresh
 (A) Hansawas, (B) Prithvipura - Name of Gram Panchyat - Hansawas
 Jeewra
 Kanhora
 Kanhori
 Kanwali
 Karawra Manakpur
 Khera Alampur
 Khushpura
 Kumbrodha
 Lala, Rewari
 Lisan
 Mandhia Khurd
 Maseet
 Mastapur
 Mohdinpur
 Motla Kalan
 Motla Khurd
 Murlipur
 Musepur
 (A) Nain Sukhpura, (B) Mundanwas, (C) Jaruwas - Name of Gram Panchyat - Nain Sukhpura
 Nangal Mundi
 Nangal Pathani
 Nanglia Ranmokh
 (A) Pahrajwas, (B) Saidpur, Rewari, (C) Chag, Rewari - Name of Gram Panchyat - Pahrajwas
 (A) Palhawas, (B) Chang, Rewari -Similar place/village is also in Iran country- Name of Gram Panchyat - Palhawas
 Parkhotampur
 Qutubpuri Bujurg Belongs to current Block Pramukh (Chairman) Ruby Rajkumar Yadav
 Rampuri, Rewari - Similar place/village is also in Uttar Pradesh
 Rasuli
 Rohrai
 Rojhuwas
 (A)  Shadipur, Rewari - Similar place/ village is also in Punjab, (B) Rajawas, (C) Nurpur, Rewari - Similar place/ village is also in Himachal Pradesh - Name of Gram Panchyat - Shadipur, Rewari
 Sihas
 Suma Khera
 Tehana Depalpur

See also
 Rewari

References

Villages in Rewari district